BTQ is the Brisbane television station of the Seven Network in Australia. BTQ was the second television station to launch in Brisbane, going to air on 1 November 1959, after QTQ (station of the Nine Network) launched three months earlier.

Along with other Australian television channels, BTQ began broadcasting on digital television on 1 January 2001.

In the early eighties, Seven National News became the first Brisbane-based bulletin to be relayed throughout a string of independent Queensland telecasters.  Within the same decade, BTQ was also a major production house for children's television - hosting popular shows as Wombat, Now You See It, Family Feud, Play Your Cards Right and Seven's Super Saturday featuring Agro (puppet). In the 1980s and 1990s, the channel regularly opened its facilities to the Brisbane public - at Open Days. In the 1970s, BTQ also held annual telethons for the Children's Hospital, featuring network personalities.

In 1995, BTQ also produced "Tourist TV", a tourist information channel which could be viewed at various Gold Coast hotels and resorts, including Sea World Nara Resort.

Until 2007, BTQ was the key station of the national Austext teletext service. The service was later largely automated out of ATN-7 Sydney until it was decommissioned in September 2009.

In July 2018, deconstruction of the BTQ transmission tower began after nearly 60 years of service. On 21 July 2018 the top half of tower which contained its broadcasting elements, no longer in use by the station, was removed in stages by a destruction crew via helicopter.

News

Brisbane and Queensland

7NEWS Brisbane is directed by Neil Warren and presented by Max Futcher and Sharyn Ghidella from weeknights and Katrina Blowers on weekends from Seven's Brisbane studios, located at Mount Coot-tha. Sport is presented by Shane Webcke from Sunday to Wednesday and Ben Davis from Thursday to Saturday. Weather is presented by Tony Auden from Sunday to Thursday and Paul Burt on Friday and Saturday.

The bulletin is also simulcast in Brisbane on local radio station 96.5 Family FM, to regional Queensland viewers in the Sunshine Coast, Wide Bay-Burnett, Toowoomba, Rockhampton, Mackay, Townsville and Cairns television markets via the Seven Queensland network and across central & remote areas of eastern Australia, on Southern Cross Central.

Previously, Tracey Challenor presented the weekend news for many years until her resignation in February 2007. Cummins was first appointed to the weekday weather in 2005 after more than a year of the Brisbane bulletin not having a weather presenter; former kids show presenter Tony Johnston had this role in 2003. Cummins was replaced by former Nine weatherman John Schluter in early 2007 and she was moved to weekends. Ghidella joined Seven News in 2007 and replaced Challenor.

In October 2002, Rod Young moved from ABC News in Brisbane to co-anchor with Kay McGrath. She had presented Seven News Brisbane solo for the previous nine months following the retirement of Frank Warrick. Their dual presenter format has proved to be successful. Following a couple of lean years coming second to Nine News Brisbane, Seven News Brisbane regained its ratings lead by 2007, helped by the recruitment of ex-Nine weatherman John Schluter and director of news Rob Raschke. In 2008, Seven News Brisbane was officially the #1 bulletin in Brisbane, winning all 40 ratings weeks.

In January 2013, Sharyn Ghidella and Bill McDonald were appointed Sunday to Thursday presenters with Kay McGrath and Rod Young moving to present on Friday & Saturday. It was also announced that Ghidella will present a local edition of Today Tonight.

In March 2018, McDonald was removed as co-anchor of the bulletin, and was replaced by Max Futcher following poor ratings.

News updates for Brisbane are presented by Sharyn Ghidella or Max Futcher throughout the afternoon and the early evening. Katrina Blowers, Patrick Condren, Bianca Stone and Jillian Whiting are fill-in news presenters, with Rohan Welsh presenting sport, and Liz Cantor and Laura Dymock presenting the weather.

Presenters

Gold Coast
On 4 July 2016, a new local bulletin for the Gold Coast was introduced, produced and broadcast every evening from Seven's Surfers Paradise studio.

Upon its inception, Seven News Gold Coast was presented by Rod Young on weeknights and Amanda Abate on weekends with sport presenter Katie Brown on weeknights and Matthew Howard on weekends and weather presenter Liz Cantor and coastal, beaches and fishing reports from Paul Burt.

Due to cost-cutting measures, the weekend news bulletin was axed in mid-2017 with Abate joining Rod Young on the weeknight bulletin in addition to presenting the sport.

The bulletin airs nightly at 5.30pm on BTQ-7's Gold Coast relay transmitters, ahead of the main 6pm news from Brisbane, placing it in direct competition with rival Nine Gold Coast News, just three years after its debut broadcast it was now no.1 in the Queensland side of the Gold Coast.

Fill in presenters include Katrina Blowers and Bianca Stone (news), Tom Hartley (sport) and Tamra Bow (weather).

Reporters

Joel Dry
Katie Brown (sport)
Mackenzie Ravn (crime)
Katrina Blowers
Laura Dymock
Georgie Chumbley
Dante Ceccon
Krystal Etherington (Gold Coast)
Amanda Abate (Gold Coast)
Brittany Lane

Erin Edwards
Vivien Von Drehnen (court)
Carly Egan
Mitchell Kroehn (Gold Coast)
Deon Savage (Gold Coast)
Carly Madsen (Gold Coast)
Alex Lewis (Gold Coast)
Tamra Bow (Gold Coast)
Ben Davis (sport)
Shane Webcke
Trevor Gillmeister

Sunrise correspondents
 Bianca Stone (primary)
 Tamra Bow.

The Latest: Seven News correspondents
 Joel Dry (Mondays)

Past presenters
Frank Warrick - news (1976–2001)
Darren McDonald – news (1980s)
Tracey Challenor – news (1991–2007)
Simon Reeve – news (2001–2003)
Bill McDonald – sport
Talitha Cummins – weather (2005–2010)

Current local programming
Creek to Coast
Queensland Weekender
The Great Day Out
Seven Afternoon News Queensland Edition (since August 2015)
Sunrise Queensland bulletins (since October 2021)

Former local programming
Today Tonight (1995–2003, 2013–2014)
Family Feud
Wipeout
Wombat
Agro's Cartoon Connection - Moved to ATN-7 in 1997.
Saturday Disney - Moved to ATN-7 in 1997.
A*mazing - Moved to TVW-7 in 1997.
Time Masters - Moved to TVW-7 in 1997.
The Mole (Australian season 3) - Episodes 2–10, except for a portion of Episode 4
The Mole (Australian season 6) - Gold Coast swing (up to and including Ally's termination).

See also
Television broadcasting in Australia

References

Television stations in Brisbane
Seven Network
Television channels and stations established in 1959